Donald Jay Ohl (born April 18, 1936) is an American former professional basketball player who spent 10 seasons (1960–1970) in the National Basketball Association (NBA). His nickname was Waxie because of his crew cut.

College career
Ohl attended Edwardsville High School in Edwardsville, Illinois, and the University of Illinois.

Professional career
Ohl played for the Detroit Pistons, Baltimore Bullets, and St.Louis/Atlanta Hawks. Among the best distance shooters of his time, the 6'3", 190-pound guard scored 11,549 points and appeared in five NBA All-Star Games in his career.

Shortly after the 1963–64 campaign, Ohl was involved one of the first so-called megatrades, this one an eight-player deal between the Pistons and Bullets. On June 9, 1964, the Pistons sent Ohl, center Bob Ferry, forward Bailey Howell, forward Les Hunter and the draft rights to guard Wally (later Wali) Jones to the Bullets in exchange for forwards Terry Dischinger and Don Kojis and guard Rod Thorn. The deal turned out to a fortuitous one for the Bullets, as Howell and Ohl became mainstays with the team.

Ohl twice scored a career high of 43 points in a single game, on January 23, 1963 in a 123–119 loss to the Los Angeles Lakers, and on December 25, 1966 in a 129–127 loss to his former team, the Pistons.

Ohl experienced his finest hour in the 1965 playoffs, which saw the Bullets eliminate the St. Louis Hawks in four games in round one. In the Western Division finals, Ohl and future Hall of Fame guard Jerry West were locked in a tense shootout that saw West and the Los Angeles Lakers finally prevail in six games, each of which was decided by eights points or fewer. Ohl averaged 26.1 points in 10 games that post-season, and specifically 28.8 points along with 5.7 rebounds in the division finals against the Lakers.

In 1968, Ohl was traded to the afformentioned Hawks for Tom Workman and a third round pick. Two years later, he was taken in the 1970 NBA Expansion draft by the Cleveland Cavaliers, though he never suited up for the team.

References

External links
 Career stats @ basketball-reference.com
 All-Time Largest Trades in NBA History
 Catching Up With ... former Bullet Don Ohl

1936 births
Living people
American men's basketball players
Atlanta Hawks players
Baltimore Bullets (1963–1973) players
Basketball players from Illinois
Cleveland Cavaliers expansion draft picks
Detroit Pistons players
Illinois Fighting Illini men's basketball players
National Basketball Association All-Stars
People from Edwardsville, Illinois
People from Murphysboro, Illinois
Peoria Caterpillars players
Philadelphia Warriors draft picks
Point guards
Shooting guards
St. Louis Hawks players